In Teria volcanic field is a volcanic field in Algeria. It consists of about 20 craters.

Geography and geomorphology 

In Teria is located close to Illizi. None of the craters exceeds  in width.

Geology 

This volcanic field lies northeast of Hoggar. Volcanism in northern Africa, such as in Darfur, Hoggar and Tibesti, has variously been proposed to be due to mantle plumes, reactivated tectonic lineaments in the crust and several more geologic mechanisms. In Hoggar, after Cenozoic uplift, volcanism peaked in the Miocene after an Eocene start and continued to this day.

The field has also produced lapilli, lava bombs and melilitic rocks which contain xenoliths. Minerals found at In Teria include granite, granulite, garnet and spinel peridotite, phlogopite, phlogopitite and pyroxenite. These xenoliths have interacted with melts and testify to the presence of old, thick lithosphere.

Eruption history 

The field was emplaced during the Quaternary, with possible Holocene activity.

References 

Volcanic fields
Volcanic craters
Holocene volcanoes
Volcanoes of Algeria